Livistona halongensis is a species of palm first collected in Ha Long Bay, Vietnam, in 1999. The species was described by Tiên Hiêp Nguyên and Ruth Kiew in 2000. It is a fan palm.

Description
The inflorescence bears yellow flowers. The fruit is green.

Distribution and habitat
Livistona halongensis is endemic to Vietnam, where is it is confined to the islands of Hạ Long Bay, a UNESCO World Heritage Site. Its habitat is in crevices on the limestone islands.

References

halongensis
Endemic flora of Vietnam
Plants described in 2000